Provincial Trunk Highway 29 (PTH 29) was a short provincial highway in the Canadian province of Manitoba. It served as a connecting route between PTH 75 and Interstate 29 (I-29) at the Pembina–Emerson Border Crossing on the United States border.

History
PTH 29 became a spur route of PTH 75 when the PTH 75/PTH 29 junction at Emerson was reconstructed in 1985 to direct through traffic to PTH 29/I-29 instead of to PTH 75 south to the nearby Noyes–Emerson East Border Crossing and US Highway 75 (US 75). Prior to this, through traffic was directed towards Noyes, Minnesota, and US 75; those wishing to travel I-29 were required to turn onto the connecting road north of the border. The Manitoba government officially rerouted PTH 75 to connect directly to the Pembina–Emerson border crossing in 2012, after the Noyes and Emerson East border stations were permanently closed, and discontinued the PTH 29 designation.

While the route itself was not signed, PTH 29 was shown on Manitoba's official road map, though many other cartographers omitted it. The only sign identifying the highway could be seen traveling westbound on the former PTH 75 towards the old PTH 75/PTH 29 intersection, which has since been removed.

See also

References

External links

Provincial Trunk Highway 75 at Canhighways.com

2012 disestablishments in Manitoba
Manitoba 029
029
Emerson, Manitoba
Interstate 29